The 2014–15 Campionato Sammarinese di Calcio season was the thirtieth since its establishment. It is the highest level in San Marino, in which the country's top 15 amateur football clubs play. The season began on 12 September 2014 and ended with the play-off final on 26 May 2015.

Participating teams
Because there is no promotion or relegation in the league, the same 15 teams who competed in the league last season will compete in the league this season.
 S.P. Cailungo (Borgo Maggiore)
 S.S. Cosmos (Serravalle)
 F.C. Domagnano (Domagnano)
 S.C. Faetano (Faetano)
 F.C. Fiorentino (Fiorentino)
 S.S. Folgore/Falciano (Serravalle)
 A.C. Juvenes/Dogana (Serravalle)
 S.P. La Fiorita (Montegiardino)
 A.C. Libertas (Borgo Maggiore)
 S.S. Murata (San Marino)
 S.S. Pennarossa (Chiesanuova)
 S.S. San Giovanni (Borgo Maggiore)
 S.P. Tre Fiori (Fiorentino)
 S.P. Tre Penne (Serravalle)
 S.S. Virtus (Acquaviva)

Regular season
The 15 clubs are split into two groups; one with eight clubs and another with seven clubs.

Group A

Group B

Results
All teams played twice against the teams within their own group and once against the teams from the other group. This means that the clubs in the eight-club group played 21 matches each while the clubs in the seven-club group played 20 matches each during the regular season.

Play-offs
The top three teams from each group advanced to a series of play-offs which determined the season's champion and qualifiers for the 2015–16 UEFA Champions League and the 2015–16 UEFA Europa League. The playoffs started on 4 May 2015 and concluded with the final on 26 May 2015.

First round

Second round

Domagnano eliminated

Third round

Faetano eliminated

Fourth round

Tre Fiori eliminated.

Fifth round

La Fiorita eliminated and qualified for Europa League first qualifying round.

Final

Folgore qualified for Champions League first qualifying round and Juvenes/Dogana qualified for Europa League first qualifying round.

Season statistics

Top goalscorers

Updated on 27 May 2015

Hat-tricks

4 Player scored 4 goals

Updated on 1 October 2014

See also 
2014–15 Coppa Titano

References

External links
 

Campionato Sammarinese di Calcio
San Marino
1